The North Star Athletic Association (NSAA) is a college athletic conference affiliated with the National Association of Intercollegiate Athletics (NAIA) that began play in the 2013–14 school year.  The conference currently has eight full member institutions in Iowa, Nebraska, North Dakota, South Dakota, and Wisconsin.

History

On January 17, 2023, Presentation College announced that they'll close after the end of the 2022-23 academic year.

Chronological timeline
 2013 - The North Star Athletic Association (NSAA) was founded. Charter members included Dakota State University, the University of Jamestown, Mayville State University, Presentation College and Valley City State University, effective beginning the 2013-14 academic year.
 2014 - Dickinson State University joined the NSAA, effective in the 2014-15 academic year.
 2014 - Waldorf University joined the NSAA as an affiliate member for football, effective in the 2014 fall season (2014-15 academic year).
 2015 - Bellevue University and Viterbo University joined the NSAA (along with Waldorf upgrading to join for all sports), effective in the 2015-16 academic year.
 2015 - The University of Winnipeg joined the NSAA as an affiliate member for baseball, effective the 2016 spring season (2015-16 academic year).
 2017 - Winnipeg left the NSAA as an affiliate member for baseball as the school dropped the sport, effective after the 2017 spring season (2016-17 academic year).
 2018 - Jamestown left the NSAA to join the Great Plains Athletic Conference (GPAC), effective after the 2017-18 academic year.
 2021 - Iowa Wesleyan University joined the NSAA as an affiliate member for football, effective in the 2021 fall season (2021-22 academic year).
 2023 - Presentation (S.D.) will leave the NSAA as it has announced that it will close, effective after the 2022-23 academic year.

Member schools

Current members
The NSAA currently has eight full members, half are private schools:

Notes

Affiliate member
The NSAA currently has one affiliate member, which is also a private school:

Notes

Former member
The NSAA had one former full member, which was also a private school:

Notes

Former affiliate member
The NSAA had one former affiliate member, which was a public school:

Notes

Membership timeline

Conference sports
The North Star Athletic Association currently fields 18 sports (9 men's and 9 women's):

Men's sports 

Men's varsity sports not sponsored by the North Star Athletic Association which are played by NSAA schools

Women's sports 

Women's varsity sports not sponsored by the North Star Athletic Association which are played by NSAA schools

Conference Championships

Football

NSAA championships won or shared per school

NSAA all-time standings (2013–2022)

NSAA regular season champions by year

 - Viterbo was stripped of the 2018 championship after a player was found to be ineligible

NSAA tournament champions by year

 - Viterbo was stripped of the 2018 championship after a player was found to be ineligible

Men's basketball

NSAA championships won or shared per school

NSAA all-time standings (2013-14 to 2022-23)

NSAA regular season champions by year

NSAA tournament champions by year

References

External links